St Peter's Catholic School is a  coeducational secondary school in Solihull, West Midlands, England. The school has approximately 1,300 pupils with 200 pupils in the Sixth form. As a faith school, pupils are mainly drawn from Catholic schools in Solihull.
The school in its present form was created in 1974 following a merger between Olton Court Convent School (founded in 1903) and Bishop Glancey High school. The Sixth Form was added in 1994.

Previously a voluntary aided school administered by Solihull Metropolitan Borough Council, in April 2021 St Peter's Catholic School converted to academy status. The school is now sponsored by the Our Lady and All Saints Catholic Multi Academy Company.

Notable former pupils 
 Karen Carney (footballer)
 Jack Grealish (footballer)
 Aoife Mannion (footballer)
 Callum Reilly (footballer)

References

External links
 St. Peter's Catholic School web site

Secondary schools in Solihull
Catholic secondary schools in the Archdiocese of Birmingham
Voluntary aided schools in England